Heterocycles may refer to:

Heterocyclic compound, also known as heterocycles
Heterocycles (journal), a scientific journal on the above topic